Esmaeil Mosafer (born November 21, 1997, in Gonbad-e Kavus) is an Iranian volleyball player who plays as an Outside hitter for the Iranian national team and Iranian club Paykan Tehran VC  and Kalleh Mazandaran VC.

Honours

National team
2021 Asian Men's Volleyball Championship
 Gold (1): 2021
 2018 Asian Men's Volleyball Cup 
  Silver (1): 2018
2017 Asian Men's U23 Volleyball Championship 
  Gold (1): 2017  
2016 Asian Men's U20 Volleyball Championship
  Silver  (1): 2016
2015 FIVB Volleyball Boys' U19 World Championship
 Bronze (1): 2015

References

External links
 

1997 births
Living people
Iranian men's volleyball players
Olympic volleyball players of Iran
Islamic Solidarity Games competitors for Iran